Tytthoscincus leproauricularis, the scaly-eared diminutive leaf-litter skink, is a species of skink. It is endemic to Malaysia.

References

leproauricularis
Endemic fauna of Malaysia
Reptiles of Malaysia
Reptiles described in 2016
Taxa named by Aaron M. Bauer
Taxa named by Indraneil Das
Taxa named by Benjamin R. Karin
Reptiles of Borneo